= Big Acorn =

Big Acorn may refer to:

- Big Acorn (Silver Spring, Maryland); an acorn shaped gazebo in Acorn Park, dating from the 1850s.
- Big Acorn (Raleigh, North Carolina); a sculpture in Moore Square Park honoring Raleigh's title as the "City of Oaks". The Big Acorn is dropped from a crane every New Year's Eve at midnight during the First Night Raleigh celebration.
